Jean-Paul Bergeron (born October 21, 1947) is a Quebec politician. He previously served as the member for Iberville in the Quebec National Assembly as a member of the Parti Québécois from 1998 until 2003.

Biography
Bergeron was born in Saint-Alexandre, Quebec. He earned his bachelor's degree in pedagogy from the Université de Montréal in 1969. He holds a certificate in computer science, a master's degree in education and a Doctorate in mathematics from the Université du Québec à Montréal. Bergeron was a high school mathematics teacher from and a lecturer at TÉLUQ.

Political career

Bergeron  ran in the 1998 Quebec provincial election for the seat of Iberville that was left open by the decision of former Cabinet Minister Richard Le Hir to not run. He won easily. He served as a backbench supporter in the governments of Lucien Bouchard and Bernard Landry.

He was defeated in the 2003 election by Jean Rioux of the Quebec Liberal Party by less than 1,000 votes.

Bergeron attempted to run again for Iberville in 2007 election but lost the PQ nomination to Marie Bouillé 168–156.

Electoral record

Provincial

References 

1947 births
Living people
Canadian educators
Canadian mathematicians
Parti Québécois MNAs
People from Saint-Jean-sur-Richelieu
Université de Montréal alumni
Université du Québec à Montréal alumni
Academic staff of the Université du Québec à Montréal
20th-century Canadian legislators
21st-century Canadian legislators